The 1892 All-Ireland Senior Football Championship Final was the fifth All-Ireland Final and the deciding match of the 1892 All-Ireland Senior Football Championship, an inter-county Gaelic football tournament for the top teams in Ireland.

Match

Summary
At this time, the club champions of each county represented their county in the All-Ireland championships. Dublin were represented by the Young Irelanders club while Kerry were represented by Laune Rangers.

The sides were level 0-3 apiece at half time 

Dublin were the winners scoring the all important goal with ten minutes to go.

It was the second of six All-Ireland football titles won by Dublin in the 1890s.

It was the first meeting between Dublin and Kerry. The rivalry between the sides would grow into something massive in the years and decades ahead.

Details

Post-match
With their 1940 win, Kerry would reach 14 All-Ireland titles, drawing level with Dublin. Dublin had been in the lead since 1892. In 1941, Kerry would take the lead; Dublin equalled the new total in 1942 but never again managed to surpass Kerry's total.

References

Gaelic football
All-Ireland Senior Football Championship Finals
Dublin county football team matches
Kerry county football team matches